Rui Pedro Teixeira de Jesus da Silva (born 14 March 1977) is a Portuguese football manager.

Having previously been an assistant to Jesualdo Ferreira and Nuno Espírito Santo in clubs around Europe, he first managed in his own right at Famalicão of the Primeira Liga in 2021.

Career
Born in Porto, Silva began his career in 2005, as a scout for Jesualdo Ferreira at S.C. Braga. He followed Ferreira to FC Porto, Málaga CF and Panathinaikos FC, being an assistant in the latter two teams.

In May 2012, Silva joined Nuno Espírito Santo's staff at Rio Ave F.C. as his assistant, after previously working with him at Málaga and Panathinaikos. He remained as his assistant at Valencia CF, Porto and Wolverhampton Wanderers.

In June 2021, after Espírito Santo agreed to become the manager of Tottenham Hotspur, Silva did not follow him to his new club, stating a desire to become a first team manager. On 19 December, he was appointed in charge of Primeira Liga side F.C. Famalicão, replacing Ivo Vieira at the 16th-placed team. On his career debut two days later, his team drew 1–1 at home to Portimonense S.C. in the fifth round of the Taça de Portugal before losing 4–2 on penalties; his first league game on 9 January was a 2–2 home draw with S.C. Braga. 

Silva left the club by mutual consent on 20 September 2022, having won once in seven games of the new season. His team were third-from-bottom, with four points.

Managerial statistics

References

External links

1977 births
Living people
Sportspeople from Porto
Portuguese football managers
Málaga CF non-playing staff
Wolverhampton Wanderers F.C. non-playing staff
F.C. Famalicão managers
Portuguese expatriate football managers
Portuguese expatriate sportspeople in Spain
Portuguese expatriate sportspeople in Greece
Portuguese expatriate sportspeople in England